Roberto Blades is a Panamanian Salsa singer. His most popular songs are "Ya No Regreso Contigo", "Lagrimas", "Poquita Fe", "Casco", "Detalles", "El Artista Famoso", "Victima de Afecto", "Flor Dormida" and "Si Estuvieras Conmigo" among many more. He is the younger brother of singer Rubén Blades.

In 2002, Roberto Blades won the Grammy Award for Best Salsa Album. He has not released a new album since preferring to work as a songwriter and producer.

In June 2010, Blades appeared on Dateline NBC to discuss Joran van der Sloot. According to Blades, he witnessed van der Sloot's behavior on the night of the death of Stephany Tatiana Flores Ramírez.

References

Blades, Roberto
Grammy Award winners
Latin Grammy Award winners
Living people
Panamanian emigrants to the United States
Panamanian songwriters
21st-century Panamanian male singers
21st-century Panamanian singers
Fania Records artists
1962 births
20th-century Panamanian male singers
20th-century Panamanian singers